Spanish Springs Airport  is a public use airport located  north of the central business district of Reno, in Washoe County, Nevada, United States. It is owned by the U.S. Bureau of Land Management and operated by the Spanish Springs Pilots Association, Inc. under BLM Public Airport Lease N-59805.

Facilities and aircraft 

For the 12-month period ending November 30, 2010, the airport had 4,650 aircraft operations, an average of 12 per day: 99% general aviation and 1% military. At that time there were 13 aircraft based at this airport, all single-engine.

See also 
 List of airports in Nevada

References

External links 
  from Nevada DOT
 Aerial image as of September 1999 from USGS The National Map
 

Airports in Nevada
Transportation in Washoe County, Nevada
Buildings and structures in Washoe County, Nevada
Bureau of Land Management